Petrophile foremanii is a species of flowering plant in the family Proteaceae and is endemic to southwestern Western Australia. It is a shrub with more or less cylindrical leaves and elliptic to spherical heads of hairy, creamy yellow flowers on the ends of branchlets.

Description
The flowers are arranged on the ends of branchlets in sessile, elliptic to spherical heads  in diameter, with narrow egg-shaped or tapering, densely hairy involucral bracts at the base.

Taxonomy
Petrophile foremanii was first formally described in 2011 by Barbara Lynette Rye and Michael Clyde Hislop in the journal Nuytsia from material collected by W.E. Blackall near Coorow in 1932. The specific epithet (foremanii) honours Donald Bruce Foreman.

Distribution and habitat
This petrophile mainly grows in Banksia and Acacia, mostly within Kalbarri National Park.

Conservation status
Petrophile foremanii is classified as "not threatened" by the Western Australian Government Department of Parks and Wildlife.

References

foremanii
Eudicots of Western Australia
Endemic flora of Western Australia
Plants described in 2011
Taxa named by Barbara Lynette Rye